Kross Pictures, Inc. is a South Korean multinational film and television production company with offices in Seoul, Los Angeles, and Mumbai. The company was co-founded and is currently run by Hyunwoo Thomas Kim.
Key business areas of Kross Pictures are film production and distribution, web-novel and webtoon production, book publishing, and webtoon platform service.

History 
Founded in 2003 in Los Angeles, Kross Pictures is a cross-border film and television production company. The company focuses on identifying and acquiring proven intellectual property to create localized films and TV series for their respective markets.

Its first Chinese production, The Devotion of Suspect X, became No.1 in the Chinese box office at openiing, with a total box office collection of CNY 410,000,000.

Oh! Baby, its second Indian feature film production, was released on July 5, 2019 and became No.1 in the box office in the Telugu-speaking region.

On December 7, 2019, Kross Pictures launched Kross Komics, the first digital comics service in India, through its subsidiary Kross Komics, Inc.

On August 14, 2020, KakaoPage Corp. (now Kakao Entertainment) announced that it acquired 49% of Kross Pictures' shares for 5.9 billion won.

The company has won two copyright infringement cases, including one against the makers of the 2017 Kannada film Pushpaka Vimana, an unofficial remake of the 2013 Korean film Miracle in Cell No. 7  and another against the makers of 2019  Tamil movie Kolaigaran, an unofficial adaptation of the Japanese novel The Devotion of Suspect X.

In October 2021, Kakao Entertainment acquired the remaining 51% of Kross Pictures' shares, and in December 2021, 99% of Kross Komics' shares through Kross Pictures, thereby making both companies its wholly-owned subsidiaries.

Filmography

Films produced

Upcoming films

The company is currently producing the following movies which are in the various stages of production:

 Indian remake of the Korean film Miracle in Cell No. 7 in Hindi language 
 Indian remake of the Korean film A Hard Day in Hindi language 
 Indian remake of the Korean film Tunnel in Hindi language 
 Indian remake of the Korean film Midnight Runners in Hindi language
 Indian remake of the Korean film Dancing Queen in Telugu language 
 Indian remake of the Korean film Miss Granny in Hindi language 
 Indian remake of the Korean film Blind in Hindi language 
 South Korean remake of the Indian film Kahaani 
 U.S. adaptation of the Japanese mystery novel The Devotion of Suspect X
 Indian adaptation of the Japanese mystery novel The Devotion of Suspect X in Hindi language
 U.S. adaptation of the Korean webtoon July Found by Chance
 Japanese adaptation of the Korean webtoon Knuckle Girl

TV series produced

References

External links 
 Kross Pictures

Companies based in Seoul
Film production companies of South Korea
Television production companies of South Korea